The Eurasian Plate is a tectonic plate that includes most of the continent of Eurasia (a landmass consisting of the traditional continents of Europe and Asia), with the notable exceptions of the Indian subcontinent, the Arabian subcontinent and the area east of the Chersky Range in eastern Siberia. It also includes oceanic crust extending westward to the Mid-Atlantic Ridge and northward to the Gakkel Ridge.

The eastern edge is a boundary with the North American Plate to the north and a boundary with the Philippine Sea Plate to the south and possibly with the Okhotsk Plate and the Amurian Plate. The southern edge is a boundary with the African Plate to the west, the Arabian Plate in the middle and the Indo-Australian Plate to the east. The western edge is a divergent boundary with the North American Plate forming the northernmost part of the Mid-Atlantic Ridge, which is straddled by Iceland. All volcanic eruptions in Iceland, such as the 1973 eruption of Eldfell, the 1783 eruption of Laki and the 2010 eruption of Eyjafjallajökull, are caused by the North American and the Eurasian Plates moving apart, which is a result of divergent plate boundary forces. The Himalayan mountain range and Tibetan plateau have formed as a result of the collision between the Indian Plate and the Eurasian Plate, which began 50 million years ago and continues today.

The geodynamics of Central Asia is dominated by the interaction between the Eurasian Plate and the Indian Plate. In this area, many subplates or crust blocks have been recognized, which form the Central Asian and the East Asian transit zones.

See also
 Sunda Plate
 Anatolian Plate
 Aegean Sea Plate

References

Tectonic plates
Geology of Asia
Geology of Europe
Geology of the Pacific Ocean
Geology of the Atlantic Ocean